Tristan Gooijer (born 2 September 2004) is a Dutch professional footballer who plays as a centre-back for Jong Ajax.

Club career
Gooijer is a product of the youth academies of FC Almere, Forza Almere and Almere City, before moving to the youth academy of Ajax in 2016. He signed his first professional contract with Ajax on 23 June 2021. He made his professional debut with Jong Ajax in a 6–3 Eerste Divisie win ADO Den Haag on 7 March 2022.

International career
Born in the Netherlands, Gooijer is of Indonesian descent through his mother who has roots in Molucca. He is a youth international for the Netherlands.

Career statistics

Club

Notes

References

External links
 
 Ons Oranje Profile

2004 births
Living people
People from Blaricum
Dutch footballers
Netherlands youth international footballers
Dutch people of Indonesian descent
Association football defenders
Jong Ajax players
Eerste Divisie players
Footballers from North Holland